Yordan Minev (Bulgarian Cyrillic: Йордан Минев; born 14 October 1980) is a Bulgarian retired professional footballer and currently manager of CSKA 1948 III.

Club career
Yordan Minev started his career in home town Pazardzhik for local team Hebar. Between 2001 and 2003, Minev played in PFC Belasitsa from Petrich. Then, from January 2004 until June 2004 he played in Rodopa from Smolyan. In 2005, he joined Botev Plovdiv.

CSKA Sofia
In January 2009, Minev signed with CSKA Sofia. He gradually established himself as the first choice right back in the team after Luboslav Penev's appointment as manager. On 23 May 2009, Minev received a second yellow card in the redmen's match against Lokomotiv Sofia.

Minev was released from CSKA in March 2011, as he was unable to stake a claim to first choice defender status under head coach Milen Radukanov.

Ludogorets Razgrad
On 30 May 2011, Minev signed a contract with newly promoted Ludogorets Razgrad. He made his competitive debut for Ludogorets on 6 August, in a 0–0 home league draw against Lokomotiv Plovdiv. In his first season playing for Ludogorets, Minev made 28 appearances in the A group and ended the season winning his first league golden medal.

On 26 September 2013, he was alleged to have failed a doping test by FIFA (in reality the medical substances had been legally administered by a doctor due to a shoulder injury of the player and there had been a misunderstanding with regard to the terminology used), but was almost immediately cleared of any wrongdoing.

On 22 October 2014, Minev scored his first goal for Ludogorets, scoring a crucial last-minute winning goal in a 1–0 home win over Basel in the group stage of the Champions League.

Botev Plovdiv

On 29 June 2017 Yordan Minev made a debut after his return to Botev Plovdiv during the 3–1 away win over Partizani Tirana in the 1st qualifying round of UEFA Europa League.

On 29 April 2018 Minev provided an assist and was sent off in the last minute of the dramatic 2–1 home win over CSKA Sofia.

Notable accomplishments
Minev is currently in the "top 20 footballer" club when it comes to the number of matches played for Bulgarian clubs in European competitions. As of 3 August 2017, he has appeared in 56 games in total – 13 for CSKA Sofia, 37 for Ludogorets Razgrad, and 6 for Botev Plovdiv.

International career
Yordan Minev made his debut for the national side on 19 November 2008 in the 1–6 loss against Serbia in a friendly match, which was also Savo Milošević's farewell appearance. He played over the course of the last 20 minutes of the game, during which Bulgaria did not concede.

In October 2011, Minev was recalled to the national team by caretaker manager Mihail Madanski for the Euro 2012 qualifier against Wales, but remained an unused substitute for the match. He played as a starter for the first time on 26 May 2012 (alongside his twin brother Veselin Minev), in the 2–1 away win over the Netherlands in an exhibition game. He was an everpresent part of the Bulgarian defense during the 2014 World Cup qualifiers, appearing in 8 of the 10 matches.

Career statistics

International

Family
He has a twin brother, Veselin, who is also a footballer.

Honours

Club
Ludogorets
 A Group (6): 2011–12, 2012–13, 2013–14, 2014–15, 2015–16, 2016–17
 Bulgarian Cup (2): 2011–12, 2013–14
 Bulgarian Supercup (2): 2012, 2014

References

External links
 
 
 
 

1980 births
Living people
Sportspeople from Pazardzhik
Bulgarian footballers
Bulgaria international footballers
Association football defenders
FC Hebar Pazardzhik players
PFC Belasitsa Petrich players
PFC Rodopa Smolyan players
Botev Plovdiv players
PFC CSKA Sofia players
PFC Ludogorets Razgrad players
FC Tsarsko Selo Sofia players
FC Vitosha Bistritsa players
First Professional Football League (Bulgaria) players
Bulgarian twins
Twin sportspeople